The National Coalition of Syrian Revolution and Opposition Forces, commonly named the Syrian National Coalition (SNC), or the Syrian Opposition Coalition (SOC) is a coalition of opposition groups in the Syrian civil war that was founded in Doha, Qatar, in November 2012. Former imam of the Umayyad Mosque in Damascus, Moaz al-Khatib, considered a moderate, was elected the president of the coalition, and resigned on 21 April 2013. Riad Seif and Suheir Atassi, both prominent democracy activists and the latter a secular human rights advocate, were elected vice presidents. The post of a third vice president will remain vacant for a Kurdish figure to be elected. Mustafa Sabbagh was elected as the coalition's secretary-general. The coalition has a council of 114 seats, though not all of them are filled.

On 31 May 2013, the coalition gave membership to 15 representatives of the Free Syrian Army, allowing direct representation of rebels from Syria in a political group for the first time. On 6 July, the coalition elected new leadership. Ahmad Asi Al-Jarba was elected president and Anas Al-Abdah was elected as secretary general. On 14 September 2013, the National Coalition selected Ahmad Tu'mah as prime minister of an interim government for Syria. On 25 September 2013, some Islamist factions rejected the Syrian National Coalition stating that "All groups formed abroad without having returned to the country do not represent us."

Structure and aims
At its creation in November 2012 the National Coalition elected Moaz al-Khatib as its president, Riad Seif and Suheir Atassi as vice-presidents and Mustafa Sabbagh as secretary-general. The coalition has a council of about 63 members, including 22 members from the Syrian National Council.

On 24 March 2013 Moaz al-Khatib made a surprise announcement that he was stepping down as president of the coalition.  Although he gave no reason at the time, he later talked of interference by international and regional actors; the interviewer named these as Qatar and Saudi Arabia. The coalition refused al-Khatib's resignation. Khatib was still considered the "primary voice" of the Syrian opposition, and the following day the Arab League granted Khatib the position to head the coalition's delegation to the Arab League. He continued in office for almost another month before confirming his resignation on 21 April 2013.

The main aims of the National Coalition are replacing the Bashar al-Assad government and "its symbols and pillars of support", "dismantling the security services", unifying and supporting the Free Syrian Army, refusing dialogue and negotiation with the al-Assad government, and "holding accountable those responsible for killing Syrians, destroying [Syria], and displacing [Syrians]".

The Syrian National Council withdrew from the coalition on 20 January 2014 in protest at the decision of the coalition to attend the Geneva talks.

Domestic recognition

The Local Coordination Committees of Syria (LCCSyria) stated that they "[reaffirm their] participation in the National Coalition. The [LCCSyria have] worked hard, and will continue to spare no effort, to ensure the success of the National Coalition in its service to the revolution." The National Coalition was supported by the Free Syrian Army from September 2013 or earlier.

On 16 November 2012, there were 497 street demonstrations in Syria according to the LCCSyria, including 121 demonstrations in Hama that "expressed support for the National Coalition" and 104 demonstrations in Idlib who called for the National Coalition to "support the revolutionaries".

Following the election of the Coalition's president, several pro-Islamist media outlets have signalled their approvals for the formation of the new revolution bloc under the leadership of Sheikh Moaz Al-Khatib.  Answering questions on his students' portal EsinIslam of The Awqaf London the London-based Damascene graduate African Muslim cleric, Sheikh Dr. Abu-Abdullah Abdul-Fattah Adelabu called upon the Islamists and their affiliates to support the coalition's leadership.

Members of the al-Nusra Front and 13 other armed groups stated in a YouTube video on 19 November 2012 that they "unanimously reject the conspiratorial project called the National Coalition and announce[s] [its] consensus to establish an Islamic state [in Syria]". A day later, commanders of one of those groups, the al-Tawhid Brigade appeared in a video with members of the Aleppo Military Council and Transitional Military Council. They stated that they supported the National Coalition and that the previous day's statement was by "revolutionary forces on the ground" who were not sufficiently represented in the National Coalition. The head of the Free Syrian Army in Aleppo, Abdel Jabbar al-Okaidi, responded to the 19 November statement, saying, "These groups represent a number of military factions on the ground and reflect their position, but not all military forces in Aleppo agree with this. The military council has announced its support for the National Coalition and is collaborating with [it]." Members of the groups listed in the 19 November statement were contacted by Thomson Reuters and stated that "they had nothing to do with the announcement" and that some members of their groups appeared in the video.

On 21 November 2012, the Kurdish Democratic Union Party (PYD), which controls territory in the north of Syria, rejected the new coalition and criticised it for "obedience to Turkey and Qatar". The Kurdish National Council agreed to join the Syrian National Coalition; the PYD criticized the KNC for doing so.

According to The Economist, as of late September 2013, "In the month since America backed away from missile strikes to punish Syria’s regime for using chemical weapons, the Syrian Opposition Coalition has become increasingly irrelevant."

In October 2013, the Supreme Military Council of the Free Syrian Army, led by Salim Idris, met with Ahmad Jarba, then the president of the SNC. The SMC recognized the National Coalition as the "civil authority" of the Syrian opposition.

In the course of 2015, a rival for representing Syrian opposition emerged in the form of the Syrian Democratic Forces and their political arm, the Syrian Democratic Council, which grew in the context of the Federation of Northern Syria – Rojava.

On 25 April 2018, the al-Mu'tasim Brigade, a FSA group based in the town of Mare', withdraw its recognition of the National Coalition of Syrian Revolutionary and Opposition Forces due to the National Coalition's inability to make national decisions. The group's decision came hours after George Sabra, Suheir Atassi, and Khaled Khoja resigned from the National Coalition.

International recognition

By March 2013, at least twenty states had recognized the SNC as 'the (sole) legitimate representative of the Syrian people'. However, most of them do not recognize official documents produced by it.

Diplomatic representation
, Monzer Makhous was recognised by France as a representative of the National Coalition and as the future Syrian Ambassador "once a provisional government is established and recognised internationally."

On 20 November, the UK invited the coalition to appoint a political representative. On 26 November, the National Coalition appointed Walid Safur to be its ambassador to the UK.

On 23 November, Qatar asked the coalition to appoint an ambassador, becoming the first Arab country to publicly announce it will accept an envoy from the new opposition body. The SNCs embassy in Qatar was opened on 27 March 2013.

On 5 May 2014, the Coalition was officially granted diplomatic status with the Washington office formerly recognized as a Foreign Mission in the US. Prior to giving foreign mission status to the Washington Office, the State Department shut down the current Washington Embassy along with several regional consulates.

Leadership

Presidents

Syrian Interim Government

At a conference held in Istanbul on 19 March 2013, members of the National Coalition elected Ghassan Hitto as prime minister of an interim government for Syria. Hitto has announced that a technical government will be formed which will be led by between 10 and 12 ministers. The minister of defence is to be chosen by the Free Syrian Army. Jawad Abu Hatab (born 1962) is acting Prime Minister of the Syrian Interim Government from 17 May 2016 until 10 March 2019.

Members and representatives
At present, the Syrian National Coalition consists of the Syrian National Council and other opposition groups and revolutionary groups, as listed in the following diagram, third column:

See also

 Politics of Syria

References

Further reading
BBC News: Guide to the Syrian opposition

External links
En.etilaf.org
 
Syrian Interim Government

 
Organizations of the Syrian civil war
Politics of Syria